Deportivo Toluca F.C. Reserves and Academy are the current reserves and academy systems including the Toluca Premier team and the Atlético Mexiquense U20 and U17 sides that act to develop young footballers on behalf of Deportivo Toluca F.C. Atlético Mexiquense was founded in 1997 and acted as a farm team for Toluca and played in the Primera División A until 2009 when a large restructuring took place that dissolved the team as well as many other first division farm teams to their current state.

History

Atlético Mexiquense

Atlético Mexiquense was founded during the "Invierno 97" season, when the team Deportivo Toluca F.C. decided to purchase the team "Toltécas" from Atlético Hidalgo, (which were created in the "Invierno 96" season as part of the expansion of the Primera División A). The team was bought and were brought to play in Toluca under the name of Atlético Mexiquense. By this, they became affiliated to Deportivo Toluca F.C., who plays in Primera División de Mexico.

The objective of Atlético Mexiquense is to form players that can incorporate themselves from short or medium time to Deportivo Toluca F.C., and to make sure they understand how the Mexican League works.

Atlético Mexiquense, in their short history, has had moments of glory, such as in their first season, (Invierno 97), where they finished as number 1 in the standings, with a total of 47 points. They were led by manager Marco Antonio Trejo. Also, in the Clausura 2004 season, Atlético Mexiquense finished 2nd place in the standings and played for the first time in the Primera A Championship in their history against San Luis F.C., (who won and eventually ascended to the Primera División).

The team does not have a special nickname, although some call them the "Diablitos" (Little Devils), "pingos", and "demonios" (Demons).

Atlético Mexiquense for the 2009–2010 season did not complete in the new Liga de Ascenso since according to the FEMEXFUT did not meet the requirements to continue taking their place, and was relegated to the Second Division, also as part of this division also cuts out Socio Águila, Monterrey, Chihuahua Indians, Santos Laguna, Tigres "B" Jaguares de Tapachula, Tampico Madero, Academic Atlas, Tecos UAG and Mérida "B" (newly promoted).

Restructuring
In the restructuring that occurred in Deportivo Toluca, Atlético Mexiquense became the subsidiary team of Toluca and the official U17 and U20 teams are named Atlético Mexiquense U17 and U20.

For the start of the Apertura 2015 season, The Segunda División de México was expanded to include 1 affiliate club for every team currently in the Liga MX. Each team will be named after the first division affiliate followed by "Premier". Toluca Premier will consist mainly of players moving up from the U20 team or young players who have been promoted but are finding minutes in the top flight hard to come by.

Stadium
Atlético Mexiquense began at Estadio Nemesio Díez (La Bombonera) in the city Toluca, alternating with their parent team.

Starting in the Apertura 2005 season, Atlético Mexiquense moved Ixtapan 90 Stadium, founded in the district of Ixtapan de la Sal, which counts with a capacity for 2,500 fans.

The team moved back to "La Bombonera" for the Apertura 2008–09 season.

From the start of the Apertura 2015 season in Mexican football, Atlético Mexiquense U20 plays home games at Estadio Nemesio Díez, while Toluca Premier and Atlético Mexiquense U17 play home games at Estadio Instalaciones Metepec in the city of Metepec which has a capacity of 1,000 spectators.

Rosters

Current U-20 roster

Current U-18 roster

Current U-16 roster

References

Football clubs in the State of Mexico
Deportivo Toluca F.C.
Association football clubs established in 1997
1997 establishments in Mexico
Mexican reserve football clubs